Dyschirius planatus is a species of ground beetle in the subfamily Scaritinae. It was described by Lindroth in 1961.

References

planatus
Beetles described in 1961